The Armstrong Whitworth F.K.8 was a British two-seat general-purpose biplane built by Armstrong Whitworth during the First World War. The type served alongside the better known R.E.8 until the end of the war, at which point 694 F.K.8s remained on RAF charge.

Design and development
The aircraft, originally designated the F.K.7, was designed by Dutch aircraft designer Frederick Koolhoven as a replacement for the Royal Aircraft Factory B.E.2c and the Armstrong Whitworth F.K.3. It was a sturdier aircraft than the F.K.3, with a larger fuselage and wings, and was powered by a 160 hp (110 kW) Beardmore water-cooled engine. The undercarriage used oleo shock absorbers and the observer was equipped with a Scarff ring mounting for a .303 in (7.7 mm) Lewis machine gun. No armament was initially provided for the pilot. The rudder featured a long, pointed horn-balance.

The type was fitted with basic dual controls for the observer to control the aircraft if the pilot became incapacitated. The first example, A411, flew in May 1916 and was delivered to the Royal Flying Corps Central Flying School at Upavon on 16 June. Because its rival, the Royal Aircraft Factory R.E.8 was an unknown quantity, it was decided that fifty of the Armstrong Whitworth design, renamed the F.K.8., would be ordered for the RFC.

The production aircraft were identical in most respects to A411, with the addition of a forward-firing .303 in (7.7 mm) Vickers machine gun to port of and slightly behind the engine. The Armstrong Whitworth gun synchronising mechanism was incomplete at the time the first example A2636 arrived in France and some early production F.K.8s may have used the Arsiad interrupter gear instead. The Armstrong Whitworth mechanism (like other early mechanical synchronising systems) proved unreliable and was later replaced by the Constantinescu gear. From the fifth production aircraft, the rudder balance was shortened and the shape of the fin was modified.

The type had several teething troubles: the oleo undercarriage was unable to withstand rough use on the front line airfields, tail skids frequently broke and the original radiators blocked up quickly. Following instructions issued on 30 April 1917, some F.K.8s were refitted with simplified vee-undercarriages from Bristol F.2 Fighters. This soon led to a temporary shortage of these undercarriages and the practice had to be discontinued until May 1918, after which several F.K.8s were fitted with revised undercarriages. Most production F.K.8s had modifications to the wings, gunner's seat and the exhaust system. The tall inverted vee radiators incorporated improved tubes which reduced the blockages. On later aircraft the nose cowling was redesigned and smaller box radiators were standardised.

In service the F.K.8 (nicknamed the "Big Ack") proved to be effective and dependable, being used for reconnaissance, artillery spotting, ground-attack, contact-patrol and day and night bombing. It was reputedly easier to fly than the R.E.8 and was sturdier but its performance was even more pedestrian and it shared the inherent stability of the Royal Aircraft Factory types. While the pilot and observer were placed reasonably close together, communication between the two lacked the "tap on the shoulder" intimacy of the Bristol Fighter (or the R.E.8 for that matter).

The F.K.13 seems to have been the name of a reconnaissance version of the F.K.8 but it may have been no more than a project. A total of 1,650 of the standard F.K.8 were built.

Operational history

The first squadron to take the type to France was 35 Squadron RFC, in January 1917. The type eventually served with several squadrons on operations in France, Macedonia, Palestine and for home defence, proving more popular in service than its better known contemporary the R.E.8.  The F.K.8 was principally used for corps reconnaissance but was also used for light bombing, being capable of carrying up to six 40 lb (20 kg) phosphorus smoke bombs, up to four 65 lb (29 kg) bombs or two 112 lb (51 kg) bombs on underwing racks.

Two Victoria Crosses were won by pilots of F.K.8s; one by Second Lieutenant Alan Arnett McLeod of No. 2 Squadron RFC, on 27 March 1918 and the second by Captain Ferdinand Maurice Felix West of No. 8 Squadron RAF on 10 August 1918.

With the R.E.8, the F.K.8 was scheduled to be replaced for corps reconnaissance by a version of the Bristol Fighter with a Sunbeam Arab engine. Unfortunately the engine was unsatisfactory and this version of the Bristol never saw service. Like the R.E.8, the F.K.8 was quickly discarded with the end of the war – the last squadron, No. 150 Squadron RAF, being disbanded at Kirec in Greece on 18 September 1919.

One F.K.8 was purchased by a pilot named Sydney Stewart in the early 1920s, who took the aircraft to Buenos Aires and gave flying lessons. There he met Francisco Cusmanich, a Paraguayan pilot. Stewart and Cusmanich offered their services to the Paraguayan government during the Revolution of 1922. The F.K.8 was taken to Paraguay by ship and called "Presidente Ayala" in honor of the President of Paraguay, Dr. Eusebio Ayala. Both pilots flew several reconnaissance and light bombing sorties over the rebel positions. In one of those sorties, the F.K.8 was hit several times with ground fire causing an explosion on board, killing Stewart and Cusmanich instantly.

Civil service
Eight aircraft were civil-registered after the war with two aircraft being used in Australia by the Queensland and Northern Territory Aerial Services (later QANTAS, then Qantas Airways Ltd.).

Operators

Civil operators

 QANTAS

Military operators

Hejaz Air Force – The Kingdom of Hejaz received two F.K.8s in 1921, at least one remaining in existence until 1923.

 Paraguayan Army

 Royal Flying Corps / Royal Air Force
Western Front:
 2 Squadron RFC
 8 Squadron RFC
 10 Squadron RFC
 35 Squadron RFC
 82 Squadron RFC
 Headquarters Communication Squadron RFC

Home Defence:
 36 Squadron RFC
 39 Squadron RFC
 50 Squadron RFC

Macedonia:
 17 Squadron RFC (part)
 47 Squadron RFC (part)

Palestine:
 142 Squadron RFC

Training:
 3 Training Squadron RFC
 15 Training Squadron RFC
 31 Training Squadron RFC
 39 Training Squadron RFC
 50 Training Squadron RFC
 57 Training Squadron RFC
 61 Training Squadron RFC
 110 Training Squadron RFC
 127 Training Squadron RFC
 1 Training Depot Station RFC

Specifications (F.K.8)

See also

Notes

Bibliography
 
 
 
 
 

 
 

F.K.08
F.K.08
Single-engined tractor aircraft
Biplanes
1910s British bomber aircraft
1910s British military reconnaissance aircraft
Military aircraft of World War I
Qantas
Aircraft first flown in 1916